Mark-Paul Harry Gosselaar (born March 1, 1974) is an American actor. He is known for his television roles, most notably as Zack Morris in Saved by the Bell. In 1991, he won a Young Artist Award for Best Young Actor Starring in an Off-Primetime Series. 

Other well-received roles he is known for include Paul Johnson in the ABC sitcom series Mixed-ish, Detective John Clark Jr. in NYPD Blue, and Peter Bash in Franklin & Bash. He was also the lead in the 1998 film Dead Man on Campus. He later starred in the 2016 and 2019 TV series Pitch and The Passage, respectively.

Early life
Gosselaar was born in Panorama City, Los Angeles, the son of Paula ( van den Brink), a homemaker and hostess for KLM, and Hans Gosselaar, a plant supervisor for Anheuser-Busch. He is the youngest of his parents' four children, and was the only one not born in the Netherlands.

His Dutch-born father is of German and Dutch Jewish descent. Gosselaar's Jewish paternal great-grandparents, Hartog and Hester Gosselaar, were murdered at the Sobibor extermination camp during the Holocaust. His Indonesian mother, who was born in Bali, Indonesia, was a flight attendant for KLM Royal Dutch Airlines. 

Gosselaar has described himself as "half-Asian", and mentioned collecting things from Indonesia. 

Gosselaar speaks Dutch, and was fluent for a time, at home. His parents later separated.

Gosselaar's mother was his manager. He began modeling at the age of five, and as a child, he also appeared in commercials for Oreo cookies and Smurf merchandise, later winning guest spots on television series. He spent his teenage years in the Santa Clarita Valley in Southern California, where he attended Hart High School.

Gosselaar has said that his natural hair color is brown, but he was "blondish" as a kid. His hair was dyed blond throughout his run on Saved by the Bell.

Career
Gosselaar first came to public notice as the star of the hit television comedy series Saved by the Bell, which aired on NBC from 1989 to 1993. His character, Zack Morris, was adapted from the short-lived Disney Channel sitcom Good Morning, Miss Bliss; although that show was cancelled after one season, NBC executives believed that a similar show, with Zack Morris as the lead, had potential for success. He reprised the role in two TV movies and a less-successful spin-off, Saved by the Bell: The College Years. In 1994, he appeared as Zack Morris in a second spin-off series Saved by the Bell: The New Class in the episode "Goodbye, Bayside – Part 2", along with Mario López as A.C. Slater and Lark Voorhies as Lisa Turtle.

In 1996, he appeared in the TV-film She Cried No, as a college student who date-rapes his best friend's sister at a fraternity party. In 1998, he starred in the feature film Dead Man on Campus. Later that same year, Gosselaar played the central character in the TV drama Hyperion Bay, which lasted 17 episodes. In 2001, he starred in the movie The Princess and the Marine, with Marisol Nichols. He also starred in the short-lived WB series D.C. From 2001–05, he played Detective John Clark on ABC's NYPD Blue. After the series ended, he joined the cast of ABC's Commander in Chief, which lasted only one season. He appeared on the HBO series John from Cincinnati. He then gained the starring role of defense attorney Jerry Kellerman in the Steven Bochco-produced Raising the Bar, which debuted on September 1, 2008, on TNT, then it was canceled in November 2009 after two seasons.

On June 8, 2009, Gosselaar appeared on Late Night with Jimmy Fallon in character as Zack Morris to promote his show Raising the Bar, indicating that the name Mark-Paul Gosselaar is his stage name and declaring, as Zack, that he would participate in a Saved by the Bell "Class" reunion that is being spearheaded by Fallon. On February 4, 2015, Gosselaar reunited with Mario Lopez, Elizabeth Berkley, Dennis Haskins and Tiffani Thiessen on The Tonight Show Starring Jimmy Fallon, where they appeared in a Saved by the Bell sketch with Fallon.

In October 2009, he made his off-Broadway stage debut in Theresa Rebeck's play The Understudy with The Roundabout Theatre Company. The show extended its limited New York run until January 17, 2010.

Gosselaar began filming the TNT series Franklin & Bash on March 28, 2010. The series premiered on June 1, 2011. On November 11, 2014, it was announced that the series was canceled, after four seasons. The FOX series Pitch cast Gosselaar in the main role of Mike Lawson, star catcher and team captain, in February 2016, and premiered on September 22, 2016. On May 1, 2017, it was announced that the series was canceled, after one season. He appeared in two episodes of Tiffani Thiessen's cooking show, Dinner at Tiffani's.

In 2019, Gosselaar began playing the lead role of Paul Jackson (Rainbow's father) in ABC comedy series Mixed-ish (spin-off and prequel series of Black-ish). He took over the role from Anders Holm, who played the character in the pilot episode. Gosselaar also reprised his role as Zack Morris in the 2020 sequel series Saved by the Bell.

Personal life
In a July 2009 interview with People, Gosselaar revealed that while Saved by the Bell was in production, he dated, at different times, his three female co-stars: Lark Voorhies, Tiffani Thiessen, and Elizabeth Berkley. He remains friends with his Saved by the Bell cast mates.

In 1996, Gosselaar married former model Lisa Ann Russell. Together, they have two children: a son, Michael Charles (born 2004), and daughter, Ava Lorenn (born 2006). After 14 years of marriage, Gosselaar and Russell announced their separation in early June 2010. Gosselaar filed for divorce June 18, 2010, and it became final in May 2011.

Gosselaar was engaged to advertising executive Catriona McGinn in August 2011.  They married July 28, 2012, at the Sunstone winery in Santa Ynez, California.  They have a son, Dekker Edward (born 2013), and a daughter, Lachlyn Hope (born 2015).

Gosselaar is a sports car enthusiast, race car driver, track cyclist, dirt biker, and pilot.  In 2005, he competed in the Far West Championships for track cycling.  He won the Category 4/5 Sprint Championship event at the Encino Velodrome.  He is a Brazilian Jiu Jitsu blue belt under Rigan Machado.

Gosselaar resides in Los Angeles. He sold his Sherman Oaks home in February 2022.

Filmography

Film

Television

Awards and nominations
Young Artist Award
1989: Nominated, Best Young Actor in a Cable Family Series – Good Morning, Miss Bliss
1990: Nominated, Outstanding Young Ensemble Cast – Saved by the Bell
1991: Best Young Actor Starring in an Off-Primetime Series – Saved by the Bell
1992: Nominated, Best Young Actor Starring in an Off-Primetime Series – Saved by the Bell
1993: Nominated, Best Young Actor Starring in an Off-Primetime Series – Saved by the Bell

References

External links

 
 
 Mark-Paul Gosselaar Speaks at Emory's Class Day

1974 births
Living people
20th-century American male actors
21st-century American male actors
American child models
American male child actors
American male film actors
American people of German descent
American people of Dutch-Jewish descent
American people of Dutch-Indonesian descent
American male television actors
American racing drivers
Male actors from Los Angeles
Male models from California
Barber Pro Series drivers
Racing drivers from Los Angeles
People from Panorama City, Los Angeles
Models from Los Angeles
American male voice actors